Dellit may refer to:

People with the surname
 Charles Bruce Dellit (prominent Australian Art Deco architect)
 Patrick Dellit (Australian rugby union footballer)

Places
 Dellit Lake (lake in Illinois, USA)